The Owahanga River is a river in the Tararua District, in the Manawatū-Whanganui Region of New Zealand's North Island.

The New Zealand Ministry for Culture and Heritage gives a translation of "place of burden" for Ōwahanga.

See also
List of rivers of New Zealand

References

Rivers of Manawatū-Whanganui